Adam Bergqvist (born April 25, 1993) is a Swedish ice hockey player. He made his Elitserien debut playing with Brynäs IF during the 2012–13 Elitserien season.

References

External links

1993 births
Brynäs IF players
Living people
Swedish ice hockey defencemen